Steven Scott Nordhaus (born October 13, 1966) is a United States Air Force major general who has served as the Director of Operations of the National Guard Bureau since November 2019. Previously, he was the Commander of the Air National Guard Readiness Center from February 2017 to November 2019.

Raised in Ottawa, Ohio, Nordhaus attended Ottawa-Glandorf High School, graduating in 1985. He is a 1989 graduate of the United States Air Force Academy with a Bachelor of Science degree in engineering. Nordhaus later earned a Master of Science degree in organizational leadership from Columbia Southern University in 2013.

Nordhaus is the son of Donald David Nordhaus and Sandra Susan Nordhaus. He married Shannon Kay Lawrence on June 3, 1989, at the Air Force Academy in Colorado.

In November 2022, he was nominated for promotion to lieutenant general and assignment as commander of First Air Force.

References

1966 births
Living people
Place of birth missing (living people)
People from Ottawa, Ohio
United States Air Force Academy alumni
Military personnel from Ohio
Columbia Southern University alumni
Recipients of the Meritorious Service Medal (United States)
Recipients of the Legion of Merit
United States Air Force generals
Recipients of the Defense Superior Service Medal